Prof. Datuk Dr. Asma binti Ismail is a Malaysian academic and molecular biologist. She is the first female Vice-Chancellor (VC) of Universiti Sains Malaysia (USM)  appointed  in 2016. She had previously been the first female VC of Universiti Sains Islam Malaysia (USIM), and first female Director General of Higher Education.

Education

Asma earned her BSc in Biology from the University of Nevada, Reno. She then received her MSc in Microbiology from Indiana University, Bloomington and a Ph.D specialising in cellular and molecular biology from the University of Nevada, Reno.

Career

University of Science Malaysia

Asma started her career as a lecturer at the Department of Medical Microbiology and Parasitology, School of Medical Sciences, University of Science Malaysia in 1986. In 1989, she was appointed visiting scientist at Tokyo University and Visitor Fellow at Medical College, St Bartholomew Hospital in London in 1992. In 1993, she was promoted to associate professor and served as Deputy Dean of Administration in 1994. She was promoted to full professor in 2000 and was appointed Deputy Dean of Research.

During her tenure at USM, she has held numerous positions including Director of Center for Innovation and Technology Development, USM (2001); Founder Director, Molecular Medicine Research Institute (INFORM) (2003) and is the first woman in USM to hold the position of Deputy Vice-Chancellor (Research and Innovation).

Ministry of Higher Education

Asma became a Director-General of Higher Education at the Higher Education Ministry of Malaysia. She is currently the first female President of Academy of Sciences Malaysia,  serving from  2016 until 2019. Her latest appointment was as the Chairperson of the Malaysian Qualifications Agency (MQA) starting from 1st Jan 2019 until 31st Dec 2021.

Research

Asma has worked on a  rapid diagnostic test for typhoid called TYPHIDOT,  which was advocated by WHO. She has published more 130 papers  locally and abroad. S  

Asma was elected to the Academy of Sciences Malaysia in 2003. She also was elected as a member at The Academy of Sciences for the Developing World  in 2010 and The Islamic World Academy of Sciences in 2016. She was elected as Honorary Member of the Iranian Academy of Medical Sciences in 2017, and as a Member of the College of Fellows, Keele University in 2018. She was invited to become an Honourable member of International Board of Advisors, Chandigarh University, India and as a Governing Advisory Board Member for Ritsumeikan Asia Pacific University, Japan.

Honours

Honours of Malaysia

  :
  Commander of the Order of Meritorious Service (PJN) - Datuk (2016)
  :
  Knight Companion of the Order of Loyalty to the Royal House of Kedah (DSDK) – Dato' (2013)
  :
  Knight Commander of the Order of the Crown of Perlis (DPMP) – Dato' (2018)

Awards

Asma received an Honorary Doctor of Science from the University of Glasgow in 2013 followed by the award of Indiana University's Thomas Hart Benton Mural Medallion in 2015. She received an honorary doctorate from Keele University and Honorary LLD from Kyoto University of Foreign Studies in 2017. In 2018, she was awarded the ‘Tokoh Srikandi’ National Award (Academic) for her excellent contributions  in the field of education in Malaysia and international.

References

1958 births
Living people
Malaysian biologists
Molecular biologists
University of Nevada, Reno alumni
Indiana University Bloomington alumni
Commanders of the Order of Meritorious Service